The 2017–18 Österreichische Basketball Bundesliga season, for sponsorships reasons named the Admiral Basketball Bundesliga, is the 72nd season of the first tier of basketball in Austria.

Teams

Raiffeisen Flyers Wels replaced WBC Wels, from the same city.

Regular season

Standings

Play-offs
Quarterfinals were played in a best-of-three games format, semifinals in a 2–2–1 format and the final in a best-of-seven format 2–2–1–1–1.

Bracket

Quarterfinals
The team with the higher seed played game one and three (if necessary) at home.

|}

Semifinals
The team with the higher seed played game one, two and 5 (if necessary) at home.

|}

Semifinals
The team with the higher seed played game one, two, five and seven (if necessary) at home.

|}

Clubs in European competitions

Clubs in international competitions

References

External links
Official website 

Österreichische Basketball Bundesliga seasons
Austrian
Lea